Act Right may refer to:

 "Act Right" (Zion I song)
 "Act Right" (Yo Gotti song)